This is a list of episodes of the Australian science fiction television series, Thunderstone.

Throughout its run, there have been 3 seasons spanning 52 episodes.

Series overview

Season 1 (1999)

Season 2 (1999)

Season 3 (2000)

References

External links
 List of Thunderstone Episodes on The Internet Movie Database

Lists of Australian drama television series episodes
Lists of Australian children's television series episodes
Lists of science fiction television series episodes